"Bug Out" is a special hour-long episode of M*A*S*H, and the premiere of the fifth season. It first aired on CBS on September 21, 1976.

Plot
Rumors begin to circulate that the 4077th will soon have to move in order to stay ahead of North Korean and Chinese forces. Colonel Potter becomes increasingly exasperated after hearing these claims repeated time after time and decides to check with area headquarters. Learning that a bug-out is not imminent, he assembles the camp personnel with the intent of putting the rumors to rest - only to receive a new message ordering the move after all. The camp is hastily disassembled and loaded onto a convoy for transport, but Hawkeye cannot go as he has just begun to perform surgery on a wounded soldier's spine. He, Margaret, and Radar stay behind to watch over the patient once the operation is finished, with orders from Potter to evacuate him and themselves if the enemy forces approach.

Potter and B.J. locate a suitable area for the new camp, but find that a group of prostitutes is using a building on the site as a brothel. Once they persuade Corporal Klinger to give his collection of dresses to the women in exchange for letting the 4077th take over the building, the staff begins to set up a new camp. Meanwhile, the three at the old site become increasingly worried as the sounds of battle grow closer and the patient's condition begins to improve. Once he is stable, they send him out on a chopper and prepare to leave, but are interrupted by the return of the 4077th convoy. The Army has pushed the enemy forces back, allowing the unit to return to its original site.

Trivia
Footage from this episode of the 4077th tents being packed up was later recycled in the series finale "Goodbye, Farewell and Amen".

After four years as a recurring guest star, this was William Christopher's first episode as a series regular.

Historical inaccuracies

During "Bug Out", Colonel Potter is offered Rolaids by a Korean trying to sell him land for relocation.  The Korean War lasted from 1950 to 1953;  Rolaids was not released to the American public until 1953.

External links

M*A*S*H (season 5) episodes
1976 American television episodes